The 2022 season was the Jacksonville Jaguars' 28th season in the National Football League (NFL) and their first under head coach Doug Pederson.

Despite a 3–7 start, the Jaguars won six of their final seven games, tripling their win total from 2021, including finishing the season on a five-game winning streak to win their fourth division title and second AFC South title after a Week 18 win over the Tennessee Titans, securing their first playoff berth since 2017. They also became the second team in NFL history after the 2008 San Diego Chargers to start 4–8 and make the playoffs. The Jaguars' 9 wins were more than their last two seasons put together.

In the Wild Card round, the Jaguars rallied from a 27–0 deficit to defeat the Los Angeles Chargers 31–30. It was the largest comeback in franchise history and the third largest in NFL postseason history. However, their season would end the following week with a 27–20 loss to the eventual Super Bowl LVII champion Kansas City Chiefs in the Divisional round.

Draft

Draft trades

Staff

Offseason changes

Head coach

The Jacksonville Jaguars fired first-year head coach Urban Meyer on December 16, 2021, due to on-and off-the-field issues along with a 2–11 record.

Staff

Final roster

Preseason
On February 28, the NFL announced that the Jaguars would play the Las Vegas Raiders in the Pro Football Hall of Fame Game on Thursday, August 4, at Tom Benson Hall of Fame Stadium in Canton, Ohio, at 8:00 p.m. EDT. The Jaguars would be represented by offensive tackle Tony Boselli, who played with the team during the franchise's first seven seasons from 1995–2001. The two teams would meet again during the regular season in Jacksonville.

Regular season

Schedule

Note: Intra-division opponents are in bold text.

Game summaries

Week 1: at Washington Commanders

Week 2: vs. Indianapolis Colts

Week 3: at Los Angeles Chargers

Week 4: at Philadelphia Eagles

Week 5: vs. Houston Texans

Week 6: at Indianapolis Colts

Week 7: vs. New York Giants

Week 8: vs. Denver Broncos
NFL London games

Week 9: vs. Las Vegas Raiders

Week 10: at Kansas City Chiefs

Week 12: vs. Baltimore Ravens

Week 13: at Detroit Lions

Week 14: at Tennessee Titans

Week 15: vs. Dallas Cowboys

Week 16: at New York Jets

Week 17: at Houston Texans

Week 18: vs. Tennessee Titans

Standings

Division

Conference

Postseason

Schedule

Game summaries

AFC Wild Card Playoffs: vs. (5) Los Angeles Chargers

AFC Divisional Playoffs: at (1) Kansas City Chiefs

Statistics

Team

Individual

Statistics correct as of the end of the 2022 NFL season

References

External links
 

Jacksonville
Jacksonville Jaguars seasons
Jacksonville Jaguars
AFC South championship seasons